is a live video by Japanese singer/songwriter Chisato Moritaka. Recorded live at the Kumamoto-jō Hall in Kumamoto on December 8, 2019, the video was released on August 26, 2020 by Warner Music Japan on Blu-ray and DVD formats. A limited edition box set includes a photobook, two audio CDs of the concert, and a bonus documentary video with Moritaka visiting famous tourist attractions during the tour. In addition, a WIZY exclusive pre-order set includes a bonus two-CD audio recording of the tour's final show at the Sendai Sun Plaza Hall on December 21, 2019.  The Sendai show was streamed exclusively in Japan on Amazon Music and Deezer on April 23, 2021, featuring uncut MC segments and compatibility with Sony 360 Reality Audio. 

The video was shot during the final leg of Moritaka's Kono Machi Tour 2019, which was her first national tour in 21 years. It was also her first performance in her hometown of Kumamoto in 26 years. In addition, the video features a special guest appearance by Kumamon.

Kono Machi Tour 2019 peaked at No. 12 on Oricon's Blu-ray and DVD charts.

Track listing 

Bonus track/DVD Disc 2

Limited Edition Disc (Blu-ray Disc 2/DVD Disc 3)

CD

Digital

Personnel 
 Chisato Moritaka – vocals, rhythm guitar, drums, alto recorder
 The White Queen
 Yuichi Takahashi – guitar
 Maria Suzuki – guitar
 Yu Yamagami – keyboards
 Masafumi Yokoyama – bass
 Akira Sakamoto – drums

Charts

References

External links 
  (Chisato Moritaka)
  (Warner Music Japan)
 

2020 live albums
2020 video albums
Chisato Moritaka video albums
Japanese-language live albums
Japanese-language video albums
Live video albums
Warner Music Japan albums